Mohammed Barak al-Dosari (born 8 December 1961) is a Saudi Arabian runner who specialized in the 3000 metres steeplechase. He competed at the 1991 World Championships  and at the Olympic Games in 1988 and 1992. 

His best international performances were a silver medal at 1989 Asian Championships and a gold medal at the 1992 Pan Arab Games. He also won the Gulf Cooperation Council Championships in 1986 and 1992.

External links

1961 births
Living people
Saudi Arabian male steeplechase runners
Saudi Arabian male long-distance runners
Athletes (track and field) at the 1988 Summer Olympics
Athletes (track and field) at the 1992 Summer Olympics
Olympic athletes of Saudi Arabia
Athletes (track and field) at the 1994 Asian Games
Asian Games competitors for Saudi Arabia